Genocide recognition politics are efforts to have a certain event (re)interpreted as a "genocide" or officially designated as such. Such efforts may occur regardless of whether the event meets the definition of genocide laid out in the 1948 Genocide Convention.

By country

Canada 

As of June 2021, the government of Canada officially recognises eight genocides: the Holocaust (Second World War), the Armenian genocide (1915–1917), the Holodomor (1932–1933), the Rwandan genocide (1994), the Srebrenica massacre (1995), the Genocide of Yazidis by ISIL (2014), the Uyghur genocide (2014–present; recognised by Canada in February 2021), and the Rohingya genocide (2016–present). Some activists and scholars such as David Bruce MacDonald have argued that the Canadian government should also officially recognise various atrocities committed against the Indigenous peoples in Canada from the late 19th century until the mid-20th century as 'genocide', especially after the 2021 Canadian Indian residential schools gravesite discoveries.

Germany 

Canadian political scientist David Bruce MacDonald stated in June 2021 that it is rare for governments to recognise genocides committed by previous administrations of the same country, citing Germany as an example: it has officially recognised the Holocaust (committed by Nazi Germany during the Second World War), and in May 2021 Germany officially recognised the Herero and Namaqua genocide (committed by the German Empire in 1904–1908).

Israel 
On 21 November 2018, a bill tabled by opposition MP Ksenia Svetlova (ZU) to recognise the Islamic State's killing of Yazidis as a genocide was defeated in a 58 to 38 vote in the Knesset. The coalition parties motivated their rejection of the bill by saying that the United Nations had not yet recognised it as a genocide.

Netherlands 
In their 2017–2021 coalition agreement published on 10 October 2017, the four parties forming the Third Rutte cabinet stated the following policy: "For the Dutch government, rulings from international courts of justice or criminal courts, unambiguous conclusions from scientific research, and findings by the UN, are leading in the recognition of genocides. The Netherlands act in accordance with the obligations arising from the Convention on the Prevention and Punishment of the Crime of Genocide. At the UN Security Council, the Netherlands are pro-active in combating ISIS and the prosecution of ISIS fighters." On 22 February 2018, the Dutch House of Representatives formally recognised the Armenian genocide with 147 votes out of 150; only the three MPs of the Dutch Turks-dominated party DENK opposed recognition as a "too one-sided explanation of history". Although the Dutch government stated it would not (yet) take a stand on whether it was a genocide, instead using the phrase "the Armenian genocide question", it agreed with MP Joël Voordewind's suggestion to send a government representative to attend Armenian Genocide Remembrance Day in Yerevan every 5 years "to show respect to all victims and survivors of all massacres against minorities", said Foreign Minister Sigrid Kaag. On 9 February 2021, a large majority of the House supported a motion calling on the government to fully recognise the Armenian genocide and dropping the phrase "the Armenian genocide question"; the only parties who did not support the call were the VVD, and again DENK. Inge Drost, spokesperson for the Federation Armenian Organisations Netherlands, stated in April 2021: "Every time recognition was brought up, it turned out to be a political bargaining tool. Then a country wanted get something out of Turkey, and threatened to recognise the Armenian genocide. Then eventually, it did not happen. It's a very sensitive issue for us."

United Kingdom 
The legal department of the British Foreign, Commonwealth and Development Office has a long-standing policy, dating back to the 1948 passing of the Genocide Convention, of refusing to give a legal description to potential war crimes. For this reason, it has sought to dissuade any UK governmental institution from making claims about genocide. On 20 April 2016, the House of Commons of the United Kingdom unanimously supported a motion to declare that the treatment of Yazidis and Christians by the Islamic State amounted to genocide, to condemn it as such, and to refer the issue to the UN Security Council. It was almost unprecedented for British parliamentarians to collectively to declare war-time actions as genocide, because in doing so, Conservative MPs defied their fellow party members in the UK government. Foreign Office secretary Tobias Ellwood – who was jeered at and interrupted by MPs during his speech in the debate – stated that he personally believed genocide had taken place, but that it was not up to politicians to make that determination, but to the courts.

United States 

Between 1989 and 2022, the United States Department of State has formally recognized eight genocides: in Bosnia (1993), Rwanda (1994), Iraq (1995), Darfur (2004), and areas under the control of ISIS (2016 and 2017). During the last days of the Trump Administration the Uyghur genocide was recognized, a decision affirmed by the Biden Administration, which also recognized the Armenian Genocide in April 2021 and the Rohingya Genocide in Burma/Myanmar, with the determination coming in March 2022. Three other cases were considered, namely Burundi in the mid-1990s, Sudan's "Two Areas" in 2013, and Burma in 2018, but ultimately the process of recognition was not completed. A March 2019 USHMM report by Buchwald & Keith stated: "No formal policy exists or has existed to guide how or when the US government decides whether genocide has occurred and whether to state its conclusion publicly." However, there are two memoranda – the first written by Secretary of State Warren Christopher in May 1994 regarding Rwanda, and the second by Secretary of State Colin Powell in June 2004 regarding Darfur – that provide some insight into the decision-making process, and advise or authoritise U.S. government officials on what to do in genocide recognition questions.

By event

Pacification of Algeria

Anfal campaign 
The Kurdistan Regional Government has set aside 14 April as a day of remembrance for the Al-Anfal campaign. In Sulaymanya a museum was established in the former prison of the Directorate of General Security. Many Iraqi Arabs reject that any mass killings of Kurds occurred during the Anfal campaign.

On 28 February 2013, the British House of Commons formally recognized the Anfal as genocide following a campaign led by Conservative MP Nadhim Zahawi, who is of Kurdish descent.

Armenian genocide

Anti-Sikh riots 
The 1984 anti-Sikh riots, also known as the 1984 Sikh Massacre, was a series of organised pogroms against Sikhs in India following the assassination of Indira Gandhi by her Sikh bodyguards. The ruling Indian National Congress had been in active complicity with the mob, as to the organisation of the riots. Government estimates project that about 2,800 Sikhs were killed in Delhi and 3,350 nationwide, whilst independent sources estimate the number of deaths at about 8,000–17,000.

Assyrian genocide (Sayfo)

Atrocities in the Congo Free State

Black War

Bosnian genocide 

The term "Bosnian genocide" refers to either the Srebrenica massacre, or the wider crimes against humanity and ethnic cleansing campaign which was waged throughout the areas of Bosnia and Herzegovina which were controlled by the Army of Republika Srpska (VRS) during the Bosnian War of 1992–1995. The events in Srebrenica in 1995 included the killing of more than 8,000 Bosniak (Bosnian Muslim) men and boys, as well as the mass expulsion of another 25,000–30,000 Bosniak civilians by VRS units under the command of General Ratko Mladić.

In the 1990s, several authorities asserted that the ethnic cleansing campaign which was carried out by elements of the Bosnian Serb army was a genocide. These included a resolution by the United Nations General Assembly and three convictions for genocide in German courts (the convictions were based upon a wider interpretation of genocide than that used by international courts). In 2005, the United States Congress passed a resolution declaring that "the Serbian policies of aggression and ethnic cleansing meet the terms defining genocide."

The Srebrenica massacre was found to be an act of genocide by the International Criminal Tribunal for the Former Yugoslavia (ICTY), a finding which was upheld by the International Court of Justice (ICJ). On 24 March 2016, former Bosnian Serb leader and the first president of the Republika Srpska, Radovan Karadžić, was found guilty of genocide in Srebrenica, war crimes, and crimes against humanity and sentenced to 40 years in prison. In 2019 an appeals court increased his sentence to life imprisonment. The ICTY found the acts to have satisfied the requirements for "guilty acts" of genocide, and that, "some physical perpetrators held the intent to physically destroy the protected groups of Bosnian Muslims and Croats".

California genocide

Circassian genocide

Deportation of the Chechens and Ingush

Deportation of the Crimean Tatars

Draining of the Mesopotamian Marshes

Genocide of Yazidis by ISIL

Greek genocide

1888–1893 Uprisings of Hazaras

Holocaust 

There is a virtually unanimous consensus in the international community that the Holocaust was committed primarily by Nazi Germany against the Jews and other minorities in the early 1940s, due to overwhelming evidence, although there are some differences in names and definitions, periodisation, scope (for example, whether the 1941–44 Romani genocide/Porajmos should be recognised as part of the Holocaust, or as a separate genocide committed simultaneously with the Holocaust), attributed responsibility, and motivation. There is a wide range of Holocaust memorial days, memorials and museums, and education policies. Unlike with other genocides, much of the politics surrounding the Holocaust are not about formally recognising it in political statements (since there is already a strong consensus), but focus on its importance, which aspects should be emphasised, how to prevent it or similar genocides from happening again, how to combat Holocaust denial, and whether it should be illegal to deny it. Some regimes, politicians or organisations may occasionally deny or downplay the Holocaust for various reasons, such as antisemitism, in opposition to the State of Israel, or for comparisons with other genocides deemed more or similarly important.

Holodomor

Khojaly massacre 

Historian Donald Bloxham states that it is inaccurate to see the Khojaly massacre as a genocide, stating that it is a "misleading deployment of the term in pursuit of nationalist
goals".

Romani genocide

Uyghur genocide

See also 

 Historical negationism
 Genocide denial
 Genocides in history
 Historical revisionism
 Holocaust denial
 Holocaust studies
 Holocaust trivialization
 Rohingya genocide case

Notes

References

Bibliography

Further reading

 

Genocide
Lobbying
Diaspora studies